Cottonton is an unincorporated community in Russell County, Alabama, United States.

Geography

Cottonton is located in southeastern Russell County along the Chattahoochee River, which is also the Georgia state line, at 32° 8′ 49″ N, 85° 4′ 26″ W (32.146944, -85.073889). Alabama State Routes 165 and 208 meet in the community. AL-165 leads north  to Phenix City, the Russell County seat, and south  to Eufaula (via a connection with U.S. Route 431).

Notable person
 J. C. Hartman, former Major League Baseball player

Climate
The climate in this area is characterized by hot, humid summers and generally mild to cool winters.  According to the Köppen Climate Classification system, Cottonton has a humid subtropical climate, abbreviated "Cfa" on climate maps.

Post office
Cottonton has a post office with ZIP code 36851.

Gallery
Below are photographs taken in Cottonton as part of the Historic American Buildings Survey:

References

Unincorporated communities in Russell County, Alabama
Unincorporated communities in Alabama